Kelly Jean Harmon Miller ( Harmon; born November 9, 1948) is an American actress and model, best known for appearing in a series of television commercials for  mints.  She was a regular on the 1983 NBC series Bay City Blues, playing the role of Sunny Hayward.  She also made guest appearances on many TV shows, including Battlestar Galactica, CHiPS, One Day at a Time, and T.J. Hooker. Harmon also appeared in many commercials, including a series of "remarkable mouth" spots used by WRIF radio in Detroit.

Harmon has her own interior design company in Los Angeles. Her work has been featured in lifestyle magazines such as Town & Country and House Beautiful.

Personal life
Harmon is the middle of three children, the younger daughter of football star and sportscaster Tom Harmon (1919–1990) and actress Elyse Knox   Her brother Mark (b.1951) is an actor and sister Kristin  was an actress-turned-painter.

On May 31, 1969, Harmon married automotive executive John DeLorean.  They separated in 1971 and divorced the following year.  On June 23, 1984, she married Robert L. "Bob" Miller, an L.A.-based publishing entrepreneur, combining three children from previous marriages.

References

External links
 
 Kelly Harmon Interiors & Design

Living people
1948 births
20th-century American actresses
American television actresses
Place of birth missing (living people)
21st-century American women